Klima Tropiko (Greek: Κλίμα Τροπικό) is the name of a Greek album by singer Anna Vissi released in Greece and Cyprus in February 1996. It reached 2× Platinum, acclaiming both critical and commercial success and establishing Vissi's image as a pop icon and contemporary artist in both Greece and Cyprus. In 2000,Hülya Avşar covered the song in Turkish as "Sevdim" ("I loved").

In 2019, the album was selected for inclusion in the Panik Gold box set The Legendary Recordings 1982-2019. The release came after Panik's acquisition rights of Vissi's back catalogue from her previous record company Sony Music Greece. This box set was printed on a limited edition of 500 copies containing CD releases of all of her albums from 1982 to 2019 plus unreleased material.

Music
Music and lyrics are by Nikos Karvelas, Apostolos Diavolikis, and Natalia Germanou.

Track listing 
 "Trelenome (Klima Tropiko)" (I go crazy (Tropical climate))
 "Ke Ti Egine" (So what?)
 "Paralio" (I get paralyzed)
 "Parte Ta Ola" (Take it all)
 "Oti Mou Zitisis" (Whatever you ask me)
 "Horevo" (I dance)
 "S' Agapo M' Agapas" (I love you, you love me)
 "Ekatommiria" (Millions)
 "Sentonia" (Sheets)
 "Agoni Grammi" (Barren line)
 "Dihasmeno Kormi" (Divided body)
 "Eleni" (Bonus Track) (Helen)

Music videos
 "Trelenome (Klima Tropiko)"
 "Paralio"
 "Ke Ti Egine"
 "Parte Ta Ola"
 "Ekatommiria"
 "Sentonia"

Music Videos
"Trelenome", "Ke Ti Egine", "Parte Ta Ola" and "Sentonia" were released on promotional videos during 1996. "Trelenome" and "Sentonia" were directed by Vangelis Kalaitzis, whereas "Ke Ti Egine" and "Parte Ta Ola" were directed by George Gavalos, all gaining extensive airplay in local TV stations. 

In 2001, when Vissi's first video compilation The Video Collection was released, none of the videos was included in the tracklist.

Credits and personnel

Personnel
Agapitos - bouzouki on track “Eleni”
Apostolos Diavolikis - lyrics 
Natalia Germanou - lyrics 
Nikos Karvelas - music, lyrics, acoustic guitar, keyboards, drums
Nikos Koliakoudakis - Cretan lyra on track “Agoni Grammi”
Pantelis Konstantinidis - bouzouki, üti 
Petros Kourtis - percussions, bongos, darambhuka, tambhits, shaker, talking drum, ‘daouli’ drum, reck, bendir, rain 
Panagiotis Kiriazis - drum machine R-808 programming on track “Oti Mou Zitisis”
Yiannis Lionakis - electric & acoustic guitar, lute, baglamas, tzouras 
Faedon Lionoudakis - accordion 
Andreas Mouzakis - drums 
Sakis Pilatos - bass on track “Eleni”

Giorgos Tsolakos - keyboards, piano 
Nikos Vardis - bass 
Thanasis Vasilopoulos - clarinet
Anna Vissi - vocals

Production
Nikos Karvelas - production management, arrangements, instrumentation, instrument playing
Giorgos Ragkos - recording engineering, mixing at Kiriazis Studios

Design
Tasos Vrettos - photos
Yiannis Angelakis - make up
Yiannis Michaelidis - hair styling
Yiannis Doxas - cover design
Michalis Orfanos - cover printing

Credits adapted from the album's liner notes.

Charts

References 

Anna Vissi albums
1996 albums
Greek-language albums
Albums produced by Nikos Karvelas
Sony Music Greece albums